Boris Cebotari (3 February 1975 – 15 July 2012) was a Moldovan footballer.

Early life
Boris Cebotari was born on 3 February 1975 in Sărăteni.

Football career
In April 2004, Cebotari moved to Ukraine at Volyn Lutsk after he played over 200 games for Zimbru.

His last club was CSCA-Steaua Chişinău. He played his last official match for Moldova on 13 October 2004 against Scotland. In the whole 2006 FIFA World Cup qualification, he played for three times. He also played in UEFA Euro 2004 Qualifying matches.

International goal
Scores and results list Moldova's goal tally first.

Personal life
Cebotari was married with two children. It was reported that he had lived alone in his sister's apartment for a while until his death.

Death
On 15 July 2012, his body was found by neighbors in front of his home district "Botanica", in Chisinau. He was 37.

Honours
 Zimbru Chişinău
 Moldovan Cup: 2002–03

References

External links

FIFA.com

1975 births
2012 deaths
Moldovan footballers
Moldova international footballers
Moldovan expatriate footballers
Suicides by jumping in Moldova
Expatriate footballers in Ukraine
Moldovan expatriate sportspeople in Ukraine
Association football midfielders
Moldovan Super Liga players
Ukrainian Premier League players
FC Zimbru Chișinău players
FC Volyn Lutsk players